Heinrich Wawra Ritter von Fernsee, born Jindřich Blažej Vávra, (February 2, 1831 in Brno, Moravia – May 1887 in Baden bei Wien) was a Czech-Austrian ship surgeon, botanist and explorer.  

The youngest of five sons of a miller, he studied medicine and botany at the University of Vienna from 1849 to 1855. Upon graduating he joined the Austro-Hungarian Imperial Navy on December 6, 1855. The commander of the fleet at this time was the Archduke Ferdinand Maximilian. Wawra von Fernsee retired from the navy in 1878 to work on his extensive collections.

The plant genus Fernseea was named after him.

Expeditions
1856 Ship surgeon on the schooner Saida to the  Western Mediterranean.
1857-1858 Ship surgeon on the corvette Carolin, and escort to the frigate SMS Novara, sailing to Gibraltar, Madeira, Teneriffe, Brazil, Cape of Good Hope, Benguela, Luanda, Ascension Island, Cape Verde, Java, Singapore, Thailand, Vietnam, China, Japan, Hawaii, South America, as escort to the frigate “Novarra”.   
1859–1860. Ship surgeon and botanist (with royal gardener Franz Maly) on the destroyer Elisabeth accompanying Maximilian to Brazil.
1860-1861 Ship surgeon on the frigate Adria at the disposal of Empress Elisabeth (Elisabeth of Bavaria) during her stay on Corfu.
1864-1865 Ship surgeon on the frigate SMS Novara, the transport ship of Emperor Maximilian of Mexico. 
1868-1871 Ship surgeon on the frigate Donau in company of the corvette Friedrich on a diplomatic and commercial mission to East Asia, visiting Liverpool, New York City, San Francisco, Honolulu, New Zealand, Australia, Ceylon, Saigon, China, Japan, Hong Kong, Macau, Singapore, Java (Buitenzorg now Bogor Botanic Gardens). 
1872-1873 Trip around the world with the Princes Phillip and August von Saxe-Coburg-Gotha (on leave from the navy).
1875-1877 Ship surgeon on the frigate Radetzky on several cruises through the Levant.
1879 Second trip around the world with the princes (after retirement from the navy).

Collections 
Herb. Vienna [W]. Duplicates at  Herb. Berlin [B], Herb. Decand. [G]); Herb. Bot. Gard. St Petersburg [LE]). Wood samples at Franzens Museum in Brno.

Major publications
Botanische Ergebnisse der Reise Seiner Majestät des Kaisers von Mexico Maximilian I. nach Brasilien (1859-60). Auf allerhöchst dessen Anordnung beschrieben und hrsg. von Heinrich Wawra. Wien, C. Gerold's Sohn, 1866. 
Itinera principum S. Coburgi: Die botanische Ausbeute von den Reisen ihrer Hoheiten der Prinzen von Sachsen-Coburg-Gotha, I. Reise der Prinzen Philipp und August um die Welt (1872-1873), II. Reise der Prinzen August und Ferdinand nach Brasilien" (1879) beschrieben von Heinrich Ritter Wawra v. Fernsee. 
Neue Pflanzenarten gesammelt auf der transatlantischen Expedition Sr. k. Hoheit des durchlauchtigsten Herrn Erzherzog Ferdinand Maximilian. von H. Wawra und Franz Maly, beschrieben von Dr. Heinrich Wawra

Notes

 Note regarding personal names: Ritter is a title, best translated as Knight, in the British sense of an hereditary knighthood, not a first or middle name.

External links
Les Broméliaces brésiliennes : decouvertes en 1879 pendant le voyage des Princes Auguste et Ferdinand de Saxe-Cobourg et decrites  par Henri Wawra de Fernsee at the Biodiversity Heritage Library.
 Diorama of the Novara expedition at the Vienna Kunsthistorisches Museum website (click on "itinerary".

References 

 Cyclopaedia of collectors. Flora Malesiana ser. 1, 1
 Jindřich Vávra, Rytíř Dalekých Moří. Moravské Zemské Muzeum, Brno 1998.

1831 births
1887 deaths
People from Brno in health professions
People from the Margraviate of Moravia
Moravian-German people
19th-century Austrian botanists
Czech botanists
Botanists active in South America
Scientists from Brno
Austrian explorers
Austrian surgeons